Michael T. Smith (born April 28, 1958) is a former American football wide receiver. He played for the Atlanta Falcons in 1980.

References 

1958 births
Living people
American football wide receivers
Grambling State Tigers football players
Atlanta Falcons players